Dhani Ram Chatrik (4 October 1876 – 18 December 1954) was an Indian poet and typographer.

He is considered one of the pioneers of modern Punjabi poetry. He promoted Punjabi culture, language and publications through his life. In 1926, he became the President of Punjabi Sahit Sabha, a Punjabi Literary Society.

Early life

He was born in village Pasian-wala, district Sheikhupura (now in Pakistan). His father Pohu Lal, was an ordinary shopkeeper. His father moved to village Lopoke in search for work. His father taught him Gurmukhi and Urdu scripts. Dhaniram grew fond of calligraphy and went to Bombay to learn Gurmukhi typography. Though a Hindu by birth, he became an admirer of the Sikh faith after he came in contact with the major Punjabi poet of that era Bhai Vir Singh. After this meeting he felt inspired to write verses in the Punjabi Language.

Partial bibliography
 Chatrik authored Fullan Di Tokri (1904) 
 Bharthri Hari Bikramajit (1905) 
 Nal Dmaayanti (1906) 
 Dharmvir (1912) 
 Chandanwari (1931) 
 Kesar Kiari (1940) 
 Nawan Jahan (1942) 
 Noor Jahan Badshahbeghum (1944)
 Sufikhana (1950)

References

External links
 The poem 'Mele Wich Jatt' at ApnaOrg.Com

1876 births
1954 deaths
Punjabi-language poets
Punjabi people
Indian male poets
20th-century Indian poets
20th-century Indian male writers
Poets in British India